Geddy may refer to:

Geddy Lee, Canadian musician and lead singer for Rush
Vernon Geddy, American college football and basketball coach